Parken Stadium, also known simply as Parken and as Telia Parken (2014–2020), is a football stadium in the Indre Østerbro (Inner Østerbro) district of Copenhagen, Denmark, built from 1990 to 1992. The stadium, which features a retractable roof, currently has a capacity of 38,065 for football games, and is the home of FC Copenhagen and the Denmark national football team. The capacity for concerts exceeds the capacity for matches – the stadium can hold as many as 50,000 people with an end-stage setup and 55,000 with a centre-stage setup.

Parken was announced as one of 12 host venues of the UEFA Euro 2020 and it hosted three group stage matches, as well as a round of 16 match.

Geranium, a three Michelin star restaurant, is located on the eighth floor of the stadium.

History

Parken was built on the site of former Denmark national stadium, Idrætsparken, from 1990 to 1992. The last national team match in Idrætsparken was a 0–2 Euro 1992 qualification loss to Yugoslavia on 14 November 1990, and on 9 September 1992, Parken was opened with a 1–2 defeat in a friendly game against Germany.

The stadium was rebuilt by investors Baltica Finans A/S in turn of the guarantee from the Danish Football Association, that all national matches would be played at Parken for 15 years. The re-construction, tore down and re-built three of the original four stands, cost 640 million Danish kroner.

In 1998, Baltica Finans sold the stadium to F.C. Copenhagen for 138 million DKK, and the club now owns both the stadium and the adjacent office buildings in the company of Parken Sport & Entertainment.

Parken was included in UEFA's list of 4-star stadiums in the autumn of 1993, making Parken eligible for hosting the finals of the Europa League (then named UEFA Cup) as well as the now defunct Cup Winners' Cup. Being a 4-star stadium, Parken can not apply for the biggest European club game, the UEFA Champions League final, as that demands 50,000 seats.

On 2 June 2007, Parken was the venue for the UEFA Euro 2008 qualifier fan attack.

On 1 May 2014 a new stadium covering Wi-Fi solution, powered by Telia was published. The deal provides free high speed Wi-Fi for all spectators at any event at the stadium. The agreement includes a 7 year long naming sponsorship, and on 17 July 2014, the stadium name was changed to Telia Parken.

On 26 August 2020, it was announced that the stadiums name would be reverted to the original name, Parken, five days later on 31 August.

Notable matches

Euro 2020 
Parken is one of the stadiums that hosted matches for the UEFA Euro 2020. Three Group B matches and a Round of 16 were played there.

Concert venue

Also used as a concert venue, Parken hosted the Eurovision Song Contest 2001. As a direct consequence of this, and to make Parken a more useful venue in general, a retractable roof was applied to the existing structure in 2000 and 2001.

Musicians such as AC/DC, Beyoncé, Justin Bieber, The Black Eyed Peas, Bon Jovi, David Bowie, Eric Clapton, Coldplay, Depeche Mode, Celine Dion, Guns N' Roses, Whitney Houston, Michael Jackson, Jay-Z, Elton John, Kashmir, Lady Gaga, Madonna, Paul McCartney, Metallica, Mew, George Michael, Muse, One Direction, Pet Shop Boys, Pharrell, Pink, Pink Floyd, Red Hot Chili Peppers, R.E.M., The Rolling Stones, Britney Spears, Bruce Springsteen, Take That, Tiësto, Tina Turner, U2, Roger Waters, and Robbie Williams have performed at Parken. In 2017, Volbeat became the first Danish band to sell out the venue; their Let's Boogie DVD is of this concert.

The biggest concert ever held in Parken was a performance by Michael Jackson on 14 August 1997, during his HIStory tour, with 60,000 tickets sold; a second show was held on the 29th, in which Jackson was thrown a surprise birthday party after the performance of "You Are Not Alone".

See also

Speedway Grand Prix of Denmark
List of football stadiums in Denmark

Notes

External links

 Official website
 Tourist info from copenhagen.com 
 Stadium Guide Article
 Parken Stadium

Sports venues in Copenhagen
F.C. Copenhagen
Denmark national football team
Football venues in Denmark
Retractable-roof stadiums in Europe
Sport in Copenhagen
National stadiums
Defunct speedway venues in Denmark
UEFA Euro 2020 stadiums
Sports venues completed in 1992
1992 establishments in Denmark
Buildings and structures in Østerbro